Sodalitium Pianum is Latin for "the fellowship of Pius," referring to Pope Pius V; the sedeprivationist organization with the same name refers to Pope Pius X.

In reaction to the movement within the Roman Catholic Church known as Modernism, Pope Pius X issued in 1907 the encyclical Pascendi dominici gregis and the decree Lamentabili sane exitu, which condemned the movement as a heresy.

To ensure enforcement of these decisions, Monsignor Umberto Benigni organized, through his personal contacts with theologians, an unofficial group of censors who would report to him those thought to be teaching condemned doctrine. This group was called the Sodalitium Pianum, i.e. The Society of St. Pius V, which in France was known as La Sapinière.  It never had more than fifty members, who sometimes employed overzealous and clandestine methods such as opening and photographing private letters, and examining the records of local bookshops to see who was buying what. Among those it investigated was the teacher of church history, Angelo Roncalli (later Pope John XXIII).

Cardinal Secretary of State Rafael Merry del Val prevented the association from gaining canonical recognition, and the competent department of the Roman Curia disbanded it in 1921 on the grounds of "changed circumstances". According to Yves Congar O.P., the network remained operational to some degree until the early years of World War II.

Researchers are divided in their opinions about the extent to which Pius X was aware of or approved Benigni's initiatives.

References

Bibliography
  Poulat, Émile, Intégrisme et catholicisme intégral, Casterman, Paris, 1969
  Bavoux, Gérard, Le porteur de lumière - Les arcanes noirs du Vatican, Pygmalion, Paris, 1996
 Alvarez, David, Spies in the Vatican, University Press of Kansas, Lawrence-KS, 2002, 
 

Private intelligence agencies
Modernism in the Catholic Church